Sodium lignosulfonate (lignosulfonic acid, sodium salt) is used in the food industry as a de-foaming agent for paper production and in adhesives for items that come in contact with food. It has preservative properties, and is used as an ingredient in animal feeds. It is also used for construction, ceramics, mineral powder, chemical industry, textile industry (leather), metallurgical industry, petroleum industry,  fire-retardant materials, rubber vulcanization, organic polymerization.

It is a pepsin inhibitor.
Vovac, J.A. et al., Arch. Int. Pharmacodyn. Ther., 1969, 177, 150 (pharmacol)
Alphin, R.S. et al., Experientia, 1972,28, 53 (pharmacol)

Names

Sodium lignosulfonate is also known by the following names.

References

Process chemicals
Organic sodium salts
Sulfonates
Lignans